Khadijo Mohamed Diriye is a Somali politician. From January 2014 to January 2015, she served as the Minister of Women and Human Rights of Somalia. As of March 2017, she serves as the Minister of Youth and Sports in the Cabinet of Prime Minister Hassan Ali Khaire.

Minister of Women and Human Rights

Appointment
On 17 January 2014, Diriye was appointed Minister of Women and Human Rights by Prime Minister of Somalia Abdiweli Sheikh Ahmed. She succeeded Maryam Qassim in the position.

London summit
In June 2014, Diriye attended a global summit on women in London on behalf of the Federal Government of Somalia. She took the opportunity to showcase the Somali government's new national action plan against sexual violence. The initiative was launched in conjunction with Somalia's constituent regional administrations and local civil society groups.

National Action Plan
In August 2014, Diriye announced that the Ministry of Women and Human Rights had completed a new national action plan on human rights. To this end, she indicated that her office was finalizing a National Child Protection Policy, with AMISOM providing support. The Somali authorities were also in the process of synchronizing the country's laws with regional and international human rights instruments and conventions. Additionally, Diriye stated that the Somali federal government would ratify the African Charter on the Rights and Welfare of the Child.

As part of the initiative, the Ministry of Women and Human Rights in December 2014 organized a public awareness campaign in Mogadishu on the importance of human rights and how citizens can ensure their protection. It also completed legislation on a new Human Rights Commission bill.

End of term
On 27 January 2015, Diriye's term as Minister of Women and Human Rights of Somalia ended, following the appointment of a new Cabinet by Prime Minister Omar Abdirashid Ali Sharmarke. She was succeeded at the position by Sahra Mohamed Ali Samatar.

References

Living people
Government ministers of Somalia
1949 births